Glen Earl Boothe (born March 8, 1988), professionally known as Knxwledge (pronounced "knowledge"), is an American hip hop record producer and songwriter based in Los Angeles, California. Since 2009, he has had over 100 releases via Bandcamp. His songs are often a mix of various genres, such as jazz, soul, old-school hip hop, and modern rap.

Career
In 2010, he released his debut album Klouds via All City. In 2013, he released a 53-track retrospective compilation titled Anthology on cassette, which was released by Leaving Records. 

In 2015, he released his debut album for Stones Throw Records, Hud Dreems, and produced the track "Momma" on Kendrick Lamar's junior release, To Pimp a Butterfly, which went on to win Best Rap Album at the 58th annual Grammy Awards in 2016. His work alongside Anderson .Paak as the duo NxWorries has received critical acclaim. In March 2020 he released 1988, his second album for Stones Throw.

Knxwledge gained popularity rather quickly at first by making his beats line up with freestyles from famous rappers like Meek Mill. This ended up giving him the rise in popularity that attracted millions of fans to his music. Meek Mill shortly thereafter threatened DMCA strikes against Knxwledge for using his personal content, causing Knxwledge to delete every Meek Mill mash-up.

Discography

Albums

 2010 : Klouds
 2010 : SKR∆WBERRiES.FUNR∆iSRS VOL.3
 2011 : Old.Klouds.LP
 2012 : Ovrstnd.LP
 2012 : koapastetik.LP
 2012 : klemintine|taype
 2012 : Buttrskotch (LR023)
 2013 : relevnt.b/sde_LP.
 2013 : Anthology
 2013 : Ovrstnd.B.Sde_
 2013 : Kauliflowr
 2015 : Hud Dreems
 2017 : GREENTXTS.V1
 2018 : GT.V2
 2019 : Musiq.Prt_1
 2019 : TodaysAlreadYesterday.
 2019 : 終了していません
 2020 : 1988
 2020 : Musiq.PRT_2
 2020 : 10,000 Proof
 2022 : 家.V1

Hexual Sealings series

 2011 : Hexual.Sealings.LP
 2011 : HexualSealings.EP.1.5
 2012 : Hexual.Sealings.Vol.2
 2012 : Hexual.Sealings.Vol.2.5
 2012 : Hexual.Sealings.Vol.3_[bootleg]
 2012 : Hexual.Sealings.Pt.3.5
 2013 : Hexual.Sealings.Pt.4.b-side_
 2013 : hex.4.∆.side_
 2013 : Hexual.Sealings.Prt.4.5_
 2013 : Hexual.Sealings.Prt.5
 2013 : Hexual.Sealings.Prt5.5_
 2013 : Hexual.Sealings.Prt.6_
 2014 : HexualSealings.Prt.7
 2014 : Hexual.Sealings.PRT.7.5
 2015 : H.S.PRT.8* 
 2015 : HS8.8_
 2015 : H.S.PRT9_
 2016 : HEX.9.8_
 2016 : HEX10.
 2017 : HEX.10.8_
 2017 : HEX.11_
 2017 : HX11.8_
 2018 : HEX.PRT12
 2018 : HX.12.8
 2019 : HX.PRT13_
 2019 : HX.PRT_13.8
 2020 : HX.PRT14_
 2020 : HX.PRT14.8
 2020 : HX.PRT_15
 2020 : HX.PRT15.8_
 2021 : HX.PRT16_
 2021 : HX.PRT17
 2021 : HX.18
 2021 : HX.19
 2021 : HX.20
 2022 : HX.21
 2022 : HX.22
 2022 : HX.23

Wrap Taypes series

 2011 : WrapTaypes.Port.1
 2012 : WrapTaypes.Port2[bootleg]
 2012 : WrapTaypes.Prt3
 2012 : WrapTaypes.Prt.4
 2013 : WrapTaypes.Prt.4.5_
 2013 : WrapTaypes.PRT.5
 2013 : WrapTaypes.PRT.5.5[bootleg]
 2013 : WrapTaypes.Prt.6
 2013 : WrapTaypes.Prt6.6_[bootleg]
 2014 : WrapTaypes.Prt.7_
 2015 : WT.PRT.7.5_
 2015 : WT.PRT.8_
 2015 : WT.PRT9_
 2015 : WrapTaypes
 2016 : WT.9.8_  
 2016 : WT.PRT10_
 2017 : WT.PRT10.8_
 2017 : WT.PRT.11_
 2017 : WT.11_8
 2017 : WT.12_
 2017 : WT.12.8_
 2018 : WT.PRT_13
 2018 : WT.13.8_[ラフミックス]
 2019 : WT.14_
 2019 : WT.PRT_14.8_カセットバージョン
 2019 : WT_PRT15.
 2020 : WT15.8_
 2020 : WT.PRT.16. 
 2020 : WT16.8_
 2021 : WT.17
 2021 : WT.18
 2022 : WT.19
 2022 : WT.20

Video Game Music series

 2020 : VGM's.PRT_1
 2020 : VGM's.PRT_2
 2020 : VGM's.PRT_3
 2020 : VGM's.PRT_4
 2020 : VGM's.PRT5_
 2020 : VGM's.PRT6_
 2020 : VGM's.PRT7_
 2020 : VGM's.PRT.8_
 2021 : VGM's.PRT9_
 2021 : VGM's.PRT.10_
 2021 : VGM's.PRT.11
 2021 : VGM.12
 2021 : VGM.13
 2021 : VGM.14
 2021 : VGM.15
 2022 : VGM.16
 2022 : VGM.17
 2022 : VGM.18
 2022 : VGM.19
 2022 : VGM.20
 2022 : VGM.21
 2022 : VGM.22

Extended plays 

 2009 : 3p
 2010 : K∆NN∆LOUPE.EP
 2011 : Mango.EP
 2011 : Gwapes.EP
 2011 : Komposure.EP
 2011 : Flowrs.EP
 2011 : ShadySide.EP
 2011 : Hud.Dreems.EP
 2011 : Randomb.EP
 2011 : Konsistensi.EP
 2011 : UndrTheWeathr.EP
 2012 : komfi.EP
 2012 : karma.loops.prt.1
 2012 : karma.loops.prt2
 2012 : kuntent.EP
 2012 : klarity.EP
 2012 : kameo.EP
 2012 : karma.loops.prt3
 2012 : karma.loops.prt4
 2012 : knt.remembr
 2012 : [DB]FiXXX's
 2012 : togethrniss_b_side
 2012 : togethrniss_∆_side
 2013 : Hud.Dreems.PRT.1.5
 2013 : karma.loops.PRT.5
 2013 : Ovrstnd.∆.Sde
 2013 : Rap Jointz Vol.1
 2015 : 2PK.4TRK_ 
 2017 : MEEK.VOL1_
 2018 : MEEK.VOL2_
 2018 : MEEK.VOL3_
 2018 : Gladwemet
 2018 : 2PK.4TRK.B.SiDE.
 2019 : MEEK.VOL4_
 2020 : MEEK.VOL5_
 2020 : MEEK.VOL6
 2020 : Koko

Collaborations
 2011 : AfrikanDivas.  
 2013 : 777 #5 
 2015 : DGM.VOL.1_VATOGATO&CAKEDOG 
 2015 : Link Up & Suede 
 2016 : Yes Lawd! 
 2017 : Yes Lawd! Remixes 
 2017 : The Spook... 
 2018 : ボビーとボビーのボリューム1 
 2018 : dntaskmefrshit. 
 2020 : DGM.VOL.2_VATOGATO&CAKEDOG

Singles 
 2011 : Dryice
 2011 : Petaluma[dnt.ask]
 2016 : Fa-lala_ 
 2017 : BBYBOY.  
 2018 : yesindeed_[確かにはい]
 2019 : jstfrends.
 2020 : do you
 2020 : learn
 2020 : howtokope.
 2020: dont be afraid
 2020: [bc] tm_s not promised

Mixes 
 2011 : Krimbos[Medli]
 2012 : Takeitbak.Medli
 2012 : klosetoyew[TOUR.MiXX]
 2012 : Boiler Room Mix
 2013 : Touching Bass
 2013 : Welcome to Mandeville (New Years Edition)
 2015 : StrwbrryMomnts

Production discography

2011
 Blu – "4u" and "dotheknxwledge (Outerlude)" from Jesus
Vida Jafari – "Jukeroo" and "Movin' Remix" from Movin.EP
 Co$$ – "What It Is ?" – from Before I Awoke

2012
 Joey Badass feat. Capital Steez – "Killuminati" from 1999
 Capital Steez feat. Jakk the Rapper – "Black Petunia" from AmeriKKKan Korruption
 Chief Kamachi - "City Blocks" from Rise and Rhyme, Vol . 1

2013
 Iman Omari – "(VIBE)rations (Intro)" from (VIBE)rations
 Blu – "Keep Pushinn" from York
 Joey Badass – "Killuminati Part 2"
 Quelle Chris – "Look at Shorty" from Ghost At The Finish Line
 Blu – "Timejuss" and "Draginbreff" from Classic Drug References Vol.1

2014
 Jeremiah Jae – "Almost" from Good Times
 Pyramid Vritra – "Track Three" from Palace
 Homeboy Sandman – "Problems" from Hallways
 Hus Kingpin – "Pyramid Points(Knxwledge Remix)" and "Style Star(Knxwledge Remix)" from Richard Dumas: The Mixtape
 Fatima - "Underwater" from Yellow Memories
 Eagle Nebula - "Most Beautiful" from Call Me Nebs

2015
 Kendrick Lamar – "Momma" from To Pimp a Butterfly
 Big Twins – "It's a Stick Up" from Thrive 2
 Sir – "In The Sky", "Love You" and "The Bullet and the Gun" from Seven Sundays

2016
 Omarion and Ghostface Killah – "I Ain't Even Done"
 Remy Banks – "supreme interlude."
Earl Sweatshirt feat. Knxwledge – "Balance" from Adult Swim Singles Program 2016
 Mach-Hommy – "Gnarly Dude" from F.Y.I.
 Mach-Hommy – "Fresh Off the Boat" from H.B.O. (Haitian Body Odor)
 Currensy and Alchemist – "Cartridge Remix" and "Fat Albert Remix" feat. Lil Wayne from The Carrollton Heist: Remixed
 Hodgy – "Dreaminofthinkin" from Fireplace: TheNotTheOtherSide
 Mach-Hommy – "Selfy Stik"

2017
 Tha God Fahim – "GreenLITE" and "Dark Shogunn" from Tha Dark Shogunn Saga Vol. 2
 Prodigy – "The Good Fight" from Hegelian Dialectic (The Book of Revelation)
 Roc Marciano – "No Smoke" from Rosebudd's Revenge
 Tha God Fahim – "Tek & An O-Z" from Dreams of Medina 2
 Tha God Fahim – "Child of Destiny" from Dump Legend 2
 Action Bronson – "Hot Pepper" and "Durag vs. Headband" from Blue Chips 7000
 Mach-Hommy – "Ron van Clief" and "Faraday Cage" from Dumpmeister
 Westside Gunn – "B Lunch" from Hitler Wears Hermes V

2018
 Denmark Vessey – "Stolat" and "Sun Go Nova" from Sun Go Nova
 Action Bronson – "Live From the Moon", "Prince Charming", and "Picasso's Ear" from  White Bronco

2019
 Mabanua - "Call on Me feat. Chara (Knxwledge Remix)"

2020
 Elijah Boothe – "Simple" 
 Steve Arrington – "Make Ya Say Yie" and "Love Is Gone" from Down to The Lowest Terms: The Soul Sessions

2021
 Bruiser Wolf – "Momma Was A Dopefiend" from Dope Game Stupid
 Khruangbin - "Dearest Alfred(Knxwledge Remix)" from Mordechai Remixes

2022
 Quelle Chris - "The Sky is Blue Because The Sunset Is Red" from DEATHFAME
 Fatlip & Blu - "Street Life" feat. MC Eiht from Live From The End of The World, Vol 1 Demos

References

External links 
 

 

Living people
African-American record producers
American hip hop record producers
American hip hop DJs
Stones Throw Records artists
West Coast hip hop musicians
1988 births
People from Freehold Township, New Jersey
21st-century African-American people
20th-century African-American people
NxWorries members